Boston Township, Arkansas may refer to:

 Boston Township, Franklin County, Arkansas
 Boston Township, Madison County, Arkansas
 Boston Township, Newton County, Arkansas
 Boston Township, Washington County, Arkansas

See also 
 List of townships in Arkansas
 Boston Township (disambiguation)

Arkansas township disambiguation pages